Salem Bouhageb (born Bembla, 1824 or 1827 - died La Marsa, July 14, 1924) was a Tunisian reformer, jurist, and poet.  He was considered one of the leading Tunisian reformers of his era; among his many disciples were Béchir Sfar, Abdelaziz Thâalbi, Ali Bach Hamba, Mohamed Nakhli, Mahmoud Messadi, Mohamed Snoussi and Mohamed Tahar Ben Achour.  His son  Khelil Bouhageb was Prime Minister of Tunisia for a time; another son, Hassine Bouhageb, was a doctor.

References
loc.gov
bouhageb.com
archives.lapresse.tn

19th-century Tunisian poets
Tunisian jurists
1820s births
1924 deaths
20th-century Tunisian poets